Supernatural is a 1933 American pre-Code supernatural horror film directed by Victor Halperin, and starring Carole Lombard and Alan Dinehart. The film follows a woman who attends a staged séance only to find herself possessed by the spirit of an executed murderess.

The film was the followup to Halperin's White Zombie and uses many members of the crew from that film in its production. Trouble grew on the set between Carole Lombard and the director as Lombard felt she was more suited for comedy films. Tensions on the set were compounded by the 1933 Long Beach earthquake, which temporarily stopped production. The film was not as financially successful as White Zombie on its initial release.

Plot
In New York City, Ruth Rogen is on death row for murdering three of her former lovers. Her fourth lover, a charlatan psychic named Paul Bavian, betrayed her to the police. Dr. Carl Houston believes the evil spirit of an executed murderer goes abroad to commit more crimes after death, and gets permission to experiment on Rogen's body after she is executed via the electric chair.

Meanwhile, heiress Roma Courtney is contacted by Bavian, who claims her recently-deceased twin brother, John, wants to send her a message. When Bavian's landlady threatens to expose him, he murders her with a ring that has a poisoned needle. Roma and her fiancé, Grant Wilson, attend a séance performed by Bavian. Bavian tricks Roma into believing her brother was murdered by Hammond, manager of the Courtney estate. Roma and Grant leave the séance, and visit Dr. Houston. He is busy in his laboratory trying to reanimate Rogen's body by pumping the corpse full of electricity. When Rogen's eyes open, the shocked couple are asked to leave the lab as Dr. Houston explains what he is attempting to do. Suddenly, a wind bursts through the room and the spirit of Rogen tries to enter Roma's body, leaving fingerprints on Roma's neck.

In an attempt to prove Bavian a fraud, Grant schedules a second séance at Roma's home. Once more, Bavian uses tricks to convince Roma that Hammond is a murderer. Hammond scuffles with Bavian, and Bavian uses his ring to kill Hammond. At that moment, Rogen's spirit enters Roma's body. The possessed Roma agrees to leave with Bavian. They go to her former apartment. Bavian doesn't realize Roma is possessed and Bavian declares is disdain for Rogen and his desire for Roma. When the landlord tells them to leave, Bavian suggests they adjourn to Roma's yacht. They passionately embrace. Meanwhile, Grant aided by John's ghost, realizes Roma is possessed and rushes to the yacht. At the yacht during afterglow, Bavian and Roma exchange chatter and Bavian gets spooked by Roma's mannerisms that seem familiar to Rogen's. Grant arrives just in time to prevent Rogen/Roma from strangling Bavian and Bavian from killing Roma. Exposed, Bavian runs and as he tries to leave, Rogen's spirit follows and wraps a rope around his neck, hangs him. Rogen's spirit departs. John's spirit subtly urges the two to marry.

Cast

Analysis
Film scholar Edmund Bansak views Supernatural as a precursor to Cat People (1942), as it employs a "female predator whose killing instincts are triggered by sexual passion."

Production

Supernatural reunited the Halperin brothers with their crew they had on White Zombie. This included screenwriter Garnett Weston and cinematographer Arthur Martinelli. They also had Oliver Lodge aboard as a technical director. Madge Bellamy wrote in her autobiography that the Halperin Brothers tried to get her from Paramount Studios for the lead role, but the studio insisted on signing Carole Lombard from Fox Studios. According to Bellamy, Lombard resented her role in the film as "her forte was comedy."

Filming took place on the Paramount Studios lot in Los Angeles, California in the spring of 1933. Lombard's resentment towards the film often led to arguments on the set with Halperin. The 1933 Long Beach earthquake hit while filming which caused the cast and crew to run from the studio set shrieking in fright.

Release
Supernatural premiered at the New York Paramount on April 21, 1933. Durings its week-long theatrical run there, it grossed $23,300. The film played at smaller theaters and even as a second film in a double feature. The film continued to screen throughout the year, opening in May in western cities such as Austin and Salt Lake City before opening in July in Salem, Oregon and Casper, Wyoming. It continued to screen in various U.S. cities through the Christmas season.

Internationally, it premiered in Australia in July 1933 and in the United Kingdom on February 10, 1934. The film was not as much of a financial success as Halperin's previous film White Zombie.

Due to the film's sexual content, it was rarely aired on television, similar to Island of Lost Souls and Murders in the Zoo.

Reception

From contemporary reviews, The New York Herald gave the film a positive review stating that the film "doesn't make a bit of sense, but it does supply a lot of unwitting fun." Newsweek praised the film's script, pacing and direction. The New York Times praised the acting of Lombard and Dinehart as well as that the film "succeeds in awakening no little interest in its spooky doings." The Film Daily noted the script which was "not developed in a manner that makes for good entertainment". Variety referred to it negatively as a film that dies within the first half-hour.

In retrospective Kim Newman described the film as a "a fascinating mix of the bizarre and the conventional, affords Carole Lombard one of her strangest roles". Newman added that Randolph Scott was miscast, stating that he "stands around in a tux as Roma's dull love interest" Newman also commented on Garnett Weston's script that was "an idea more impressive in concept than the execution" and that it contained "too many drawing-room chats between more interesting low-life material."

References

Sources

External links

1933 films
1933 horror films
American black-and-white films
American supernatural horror films
Films directed by Victor Halperin
Films about psychic powers
Films set in Manhattan
Films shot in Los Angeles
Paramount Pictures films
1930s English-language films
1930s American films